Cecilie Løveid (born 21 August 1951) is a Norwegian novelist, poet, playwright, and writer of children's books.

Personal life
Løveid was born in Mysen to ship's captain Erik Løveid and actress Ingrid Cecilie Meyer. She had a cohabiting relationship with musician Bjørn Ianke.

Career
Løveid made her literary debut in 1972, with the novel Most. She received the Gyldendal Prize in 2001. Løveid's first play was the one-act Tingene, tingene, published in the literary magazine Vinduet in 1976. In total she has written about thirty plays, librettos or other texts for radio or stage performance.

In 2013 the poem "Punishment" (Straff) was printed in Aftenposten, as "This Week's Poem", on 8 April. In an interview with the newspaper she said that the poem is about Breivik, and that she has no opinion about the verdict of his trial—because that is outside the scope of the poem. The poem starts with "I am glad that he got the punishment that he got. As [it is] known, he will be led by the hand, from grave to grave." It ends with "Therefore, and even if he does all of this, it will be calm/quiet."

Awards 
Gyldendal's Endowment 1979 (shared with Wera Sæther)
Prix Italia 1982
Aschehoug Prize 1984
Dobloug Prize 1990 (Shared with Johannes Heggland)
Ibsen Prize 1999
Gyldendal Prize 2001
Brage Prize, open class 2017

References

External links 
Author's homepage

 
 
 

1951 births
Living people
People from Eidsberg
20th-century Norwegian novelists
21st-century Norwegian novelists
21st-century Norwegian poets
20th-century Norwegian women writers
21st-century Norwegian women writers
Norwegian children's writers
Women librettists
Norwegian dramatists and playwrights
Norwegian women novelists
Dobloug Prize winners
Norwegian women children's writers
Norwegian women dramatists and playwrights
Norwegian women poets